Evgeny Tsaregorodtsev (born February 3, 1983) is a Russian professional ice hockey goaltender. He is currently playing with Atlant Moscow Oblast of the Kontinental Hockey League (KHL).

Career 
Tsaregorodtsev made his Kontinental Hockey League debut playing with Avangard Omsk during the 2008–09 KHL season. During the 2011–12 season, he played net with HC Donbass of the Russian Major League (VHL).

References

External links

1983 births
Living people
Avtomobilist Yekaterinburg players
HC Donbass players
Zauralie Kurgan players
Russian ice hockey goaltenders